Cheburashka Goes to School is a 1983 Soviet animated film directed by Roman Kachanov.

Plot summary
Gena the Crocodile finds out that Cheburashka is unable to read. Luckily, the next day is September 1, the first day of school, and Gena decides to take Cheburashka to school so he can learn. After failing to buy a school uniform, they go to the school anyway, only to find it is closed for repair. Shapoklyak uses Lariska to stimulate the workers to repair the school quickly. As the school also doesn't have enough teachers, Gena and Shapoklyak volunteer to be teachers.

Creators
Director: Roman Kachanov
Screenwriters: Roman Kachanov, Eduard Uspensky
Art directors: Leonid Shvartsman, Olga Bogolyubova
Animators: Irina Sobinova-Kassil, Mikhail Pisman, Natalya Timofeeva, Natalia Dabizha
Operator: Theodor Bunimovich, Vladimir Sidorov
Director: Grigori Chmara
Composer: Vladimir Shainsky
Sound producer: Boris Filchikov
Editor: Natalya Abramova
Dolls and scenery: Pavel Gusev, Sergey Galkin, Natalia Barkovskaya, Marina Chesnokova, Alexander Belyaev, Semyon Etlis, Mikhail Koltunov, Valentin Ladygin, Vladimir Maslov, Oleg Masainov, Lyudmila Ruban, Natalia Greenberg, Svetlana Znamenskaya, Victor Grishin, Vladimir Abbakumov, Nina Moleva, Valery Petrov, Alexander Maximov
Film editor: G. Filatova

Cast
Vasily Livanov as Gena the Crocodile
Klara Rumyanova as Cheburashka
Yuri Andreyev as Shapoklyak
Georgi Burkov as Salesman

Trivia
Unlike in the first two films where Cheburashka could read, in this film, he is unable to read.
This is the only film out of the original four to be ten minutes long as opposed to twenty.

External links
Cheburashka Goes to School at Animator.ru
 Cheburashka Goes to School on Russian Film Hub

1983 films
Soviet animated films
1980s Russian-language films
Films based on works by Eduard Uspensky
Films directed by Roman Abelevich Kachanov
Soyuzmultfilm